Mesorhizobium huakuii is a bacterium from the genus Mesorhizobium which was isolated from the legume Astragalus sinicus in Nanjing in China. Rhizobium huakuii was transferred to Mesorhizobium huakuii.

Further reading

References

External links
Type strain of Mesorhizobium huakuii at BacDive -  the Bacterial Diversity Metadatabase

Phyllobacteriaceae
Bacteria described in 1997